Mogul Thrash were an English progressive rock band, active in the early 1970s.

Biography
British jazz-rock band Mogul Thrash evolved from James Litherland's Brotherhood, which in addition to guitarist Litherland (an alumnus of Colosseum who was a founding member of the group in 1969) also featured guitarist/reedist Michael Rosen (previously of Eclection, not the children's poet/author), drummer Bill Harrison and the so-called "Dundee Horns"—saxophonists Roger Ball and Malcolm Duncan. With the addition of singer/bassist John Wetton,  formerly of short-lived London band Splinter (not to be confused with the vocal duo from South Shields), the group rechristened itself Mogul Thrash:

Debuting in 1970 with the single "Sleeping in the Kitchen"; their self-titled RCA album appeared the following year, going largely unnoticed at home but finding favor throughout much of Europe. However, faced with legal problems with their management, Mogul Thrash was forced to disband shortly after the record's release; while Wetton went on to join Family and later King Crimson, UK, and Asia, Duncan and Ball soon reunited in Average White Band.
 
Mogul Thrash released just the one album, Mogul Thrash (1971), produced by Brian Auger who also played piano on one of the tracks.

The group were also mentioned in the Half Man Half Biscuit song "The Best Things in Life" from the ACD album.

Discography

Albums
 Mogul Thrash (1971)

Singles
 "Sleeping in the Kitchen" / "St. Peter" (1970)

References

External links
 A fan page with a short biography and discography

English progressive rock groups
Musical groups established in 1970
Scottish rock music groups